Barby Nortoft is a settlement in the civil parish of Barby, in the English county of Northamptonshire. It is south-east of the town of Rugby, Warwickshire. The population of the settlement is included in the civil parish of Kilsby.  The West Coast Main Line passes through the area, making it popular with railway photographers.

References

External links 

Villages in Northamptonshire
West Northamptonshire District